Astmoor is a suburb of Runcorn in Cheshire, England.

References

Villages in Cheshire